Robert Allen Madritsch (born February 28, 1976) is an American former professional baseball pitcher. He played parts of two seasons in Major League Baseball for the Seattle Mariners, and most recently played for the Long Island Ducks of the Atlantic League in 2008.

Baseball career
Madritsch attended Reavis High School in Burbank, Illinois, where he was All-Conference two consecutive years. He was drafted by the Cincinnati Reds in the sixth round of the 1998 Major League Baseball draft out of Point Park University. He was released by the Reds in 2001. He played independent ball with the Winnipeg Goldeyes of the Northern League; the Chico Heat of the Western Baseball League; and the Rio Grande Valley WhiteWings, and San Angelo Colts of the Texas–Louisiana League.

On September 23, 2002, the Seattle Mariners purchased his contract. Madritsch spent two years pitching for the Mariners, compiling six total wins and a 3.41 ERA. On October 21, 2005, he was selected off waivers by the Kansas City Royals and assigned to the minor leagues. He was released by the Royals on September 1, 2006. Beset by injuries, Madritsch did not pitch for four years.

He was signed by the Long Island Ducks of the Atlantic League on August 2, 2008 and appeared in two games before retiring from professional baseball.

Awards
 2002 – Independent Leagues All-Star SP, Independent League Player of the Year, Northern League Western Division All-Star LHP
 2003 – Texas League All-Star P
 2004 – MLB All-Rookie All-Star P

Personal life
Madritsch, who is Native American, was raised by his father and has never known his mother. He admits to getting into a lot of trouble as a teen – "I was always playing with fire and getting burned all the time" – and said he finally turned things around after getting badly hurt: "I knew right from wrong after that."

He currently works out with his brother Ken in Burbank, Illinois with a little league baseball team.

References

External links

Bobby Madritsch Profile at Native American Sports Council

Major League Baseball pitchers
Seattle Mariners players
San Antonio Missions players
Tacoma Rainiers players
Long Island Ducks players
Native American baseball players
Baseball players from Illinois
1976 births
Living people
Point Park Pioneers baseball players
Winnipeg Goldeyes players
San Angelo Colts players
Rio Grande Valley White Wings players
Chico Heat players
People from Oak Lawn, Illinois
Sportspeople from the Chicago metropolitan area
American people of Austrian descent